Itthipat Thanit, better known as God is a Thai actor and model.

Life
Itthiphat was born on 4 August 1995 in Samut Prakan, Thailand., he is currently studying in Assumption University .He has his own brand called XXG store. In 2017 he played the role of P'Pha in the popular BL thai series 2moons: The series.

Filmography

Television dramas
 2019 My Love From Another Star (Likit Ruk Karm Duang Dao) (ลิขิตรักข้ามดวงดาว) (Broadcast Thai​ Television/Ch.3) as Sky (สกาย)  
 2020 Shadow of Love (Sorn Ngao Ruk) (ซ่อนเงารัก) (Love Drama/Ch.3) as Nuea-Mek Siraphanit (Nuea) (เหนือเมฆ ศิราพาณิชย์ (เหนือ)) with Oranate D. Caballes & Sadanun Balenciaga
 2022 My Friend, The Enemy (Koo Wein) (คู่เวร) (Good Feeling/Ch.3) as Wayu Chaiwat (Wayu) (วายุ ชัยวัฒน์ (วายุ)) with Monchanok Saengchaipiangpen 
 20 Sai Lub Lip Gloss (/Ch.3) as Danupob with Lapassalan Jiravechsoontornkul

Television series
 2017 2Moons: The Series (เดือนเกี้ยวเดือน ซีซั่น 1) (Chachi Digital Media And Motive Village/One 31) as Phana Kongthanin (Doctor Pha) (พนา ก้องธานินทร์ (หมอป่า))  
 2018 Hi, I'm Saori (我的保姆手冊) (/ZJTV) as Hu Ze Hao (蘇達浩) with Zheng Shuang
 2019 Nong Mai Rai Borisut (/Ch.3) as U  
 2019 ReminderS (/LINE TV) as   
 2022 Finding the Rainbow (Finding The Rainbow สุดท้าย…ที่ปลายรุ้ง) (/Viu Original) as Non (นนท์) with Sushar Manaying

Television sitcom
 2017 Under Her Nose (พ่อบ้านใจกล้าสตอรี่) (The Pipal Tree/Workpoint TV) as Bom (บอม) (รับเชิญ EP.23 , EP.24)

References

External links

1995 births
Living people
Itthipat Thanit
Itthipat Thanit
Itthipat Thanit
Itthipat Thanit
Itthipat Thanit
Itthipat Thanit
Itthipat Thanit
Itthipat Thanit